Gene Maltais is an American musician, singer and songwriter.

Personal biography
He was born in Concord, New Hampshire, on May 21, 1933.

Music biography
In 1957 he released "Crazy Baby" as Gene Maltais With The Anita Kerr Singers. Another release, "The Raging Sea", was credited to Gene Maltais With The Gibson String Band.

Prior to 1958, he met Tony Hilder who introduced him to Aladdin Records. Matlais wrote songs for recording artists including John & Jackie. Two songs of his they recorded were "The Raging Sea" and "Little Girl".

Among the artists that have covered his compositions in later years are Tex-Mex band Los Fabulocos, who recorded his composition "Crazy Baby".

Discography

USA 45 RPM
 Crazy Baby / Deep River Blues - Decca 30387 - 1957 (Nashville)
 Love Makin' / The Bug - Regal 7502 - 1958 (Phoenix)
 The Raging Sea / Little Girl (John & Jackie) - Aladdin 3423 - 1959 (Hollywood)
 The Raging Sea / Gang War - Lilac 3159 - 1959 (New England)
 The Raging Sea / Gang War - Massabesic 101 - 19?? (New England)
 Be Gone Come the Dawn / Rock and Roll Beat - Deep River 1001 - 1977 (New England)
 Voodoo Woman / Little Girl - Norton 029 - 1994 (New York)

European 45 RPM
Rock and Roll Beat / Raging Sea - Monopole 652 - 1977 (Belgium)
Be Gone Come the Dawn / Be Gone Come the Dawn - Monopole 672 - 1977 (Belgium)
The Raging Sea / Gang War - Maltais 100 - 19?? (Europe/UK)

UK 45 RPM
 The Raging Sea/ Gang War - Maltais 100 - 19?? (Europe/UK)

Compact disc
 Gangwar, Hydra Records BCK 27118, 2003

References

External links

Gene Maltais Discography at Rockin' Country Style

1933 births
Living people
Singers from New Hampshire
American male singers
Songwriters from New Hampshire
American male songwriters